Aleksandar Bjelica (born 7 January 1994) is a Serbian professional footballer who plays as a centre-back.

Club career
He formerly played for FC Utrecht who loaned him to Sparta Rotterdam. He was released by Utrecht after he was sent back by Sparta when he controversially demanded a place in their starting line-up in a game against NEC. He then moved to PEC Zwolle and later joined Helmond Sport in summer 2015.

He moved abroad to succeed Miloš Kosanović at Belgian side KV Mechelen in January 2016.

On 2 September 2019, he joined Dutch club ADO Den Haag on a season-long loan.

On 14 August 2021, he signed with Spartak Subotica for the rest of the year.

International career
Bjelica has represented Serbia at under-21 level, making two appearances.

Career statistics

References

1994 births
Living people
People from Vrbas, Serbia
Serbian footballers
Association football defenders
Serbia under-21 international footballers
Dutch footballers
Dutch people of Serbian descent
FC Utrecht players
Sparta Rotterdam players
PEC Zwolle players
Helmond Sport players
K.V. Mechelen players
K.V. Oostende players
Korona Kielce players
ADO Den Haag players
ND Gorica players
FK Spartak Subotica players
Eredivisie players
Eerste Divisie players
Belgian Pro League players
Ekstraklasa players
Slovenian PrvaLiga players
Serbian SuperLiga players
Dutch expatriate footballers
Serbian expatriate footballers
Expatriate footballers in Belgium
Expatriate footballers in Poland
Expatriate footballers in Slovenia
Dutch expatriate sportspeople in Belgium
Serbian expatriate sportspeople in Poland
Serbian expatriate sportspeople in Slovenia
Dutch expatriate sportspeople in Poland
Dutch expatriate sportspeople in Slovenia